Vasiliy Vladimirovich Khmelevskiy (14 January 1948 – 2002) was a Soviet athlete who competed mainly in the hammer throw. He won a bronze medal at the 1972 Summer Olympics with a throw of 74.04 metres, behind compatriot Anatoly Bondarchuk (75.50 m) and Jochen Sachse of East Germany (74.96 m). He also finished in third place at the national championships in 1971 and 1972. He achieved a personal best of 74.98 meters on 8 July 1975 in Minsk.

Khmelevskiy was born and raised in Belarus, but later moved to Stavropol, Russia while serving in the Soviet Army. There he graduated from the Stavropol Pedagogical Institute. He began training in athletics in 1963 and became a member of the Soviet team in 1970. In 1972 he was awarded the Medal "For Distinguished Labour". He married a former athletics competitor, who also specialized in throwing, and took her to his native Belarus. There they raised three daughters and a son. After retirement from competitions, Khmelevskiy fell into depression and became a heavy drinker. On 30 December 1979, he set on fire, for a joke, a costumed person during a celebration in Minsk and was charged with Hooliganism. The trial and five-year jail sentence broke him. He died from heart failure in 2002.

References

1948 births
2002 deaths
Belarusian male hammer throwers
Soviet male hammer throwers
Olympic bronze medalists for the Soviet Union
Athletes (track and field) at the 1972 Summer Olympics
Olympic athletes of the Soviet Union
Dynamo sports society athletes
Medalists at the 1972 Summer Olympics
People from Hrodna District
Prisoners and detainees of the Soviet Union
Olympic bronze medalists in athletics (track and field)
Universiade medalists in athletics (track and field)
Universiade silver medalists for the Soviet Union
Medalists at the 1970 Summer Universiade
Sportspeople from Grodno Region